Dimethylpentane may refer to:

 2,2-Dimethylpentane
 2,3-Dimethylpentane
 2,4-Dimethylpentane
 3,3-Dimethylpentane